"Life's a Bitch" is the third single from Nas' debut album Illmatic (1994). It was released as a 12" single on April 19, 1994 by Columbia Records. It features rapping from AZ and cornet playing by Nas' father Olu Dara.

The beat is produced by L.E.S., who samples "Yearning for Your Love" by The Gap Band and "Black Frost" by Grover Washington, Jr. for the songs down-tempo jazzy beat. AZ's verse was the first recorded verse of his rap career. The song was sampled numerous times in modern times, examples include "Keep It Real" by Miilkbone (1995), "Carry On" by Statik Selektah featuring Joey Bada$$.

Music 
Olu Dara's cornet work was the first on-wax collaboration with his son. "Jungle Jay" and "Dance" eventually followed, as did the 2004 single "Bridging the Gap". According to Nas:

Lyricism 
Nas's verse discusses how he is happy to be alive at 20 years old, his rough childhood, consisting of "robbing foreigners" of their green cards, and selling crack. However, the tone of his words suggest that he is reflecting rather than glorifying his deeds, and now has a more positive outlook on life.

Thematic continuation 
The song's title and concept was later mentioned in Nas' verse on the collaboration track "Affirmative Action" off his 1996 album It Was Written in which Nas raps "Life's a bitch but god-forbid the bitch divorce me". This track also featured AZ along with fellow Queensbridge rapper Cormega, Park Slope and Brooklyn rapper Foxy Brown.

In popular culture
In the 2009 film Fish Tank by Andrea Arnold, the song is played in one of the final scenes, bringing thematic closure to the narrative. It is also played as the closing credits roll.

Track listing

A-side
 "Life's a Bitch (Radio)" (3:37)
 "Life's a Bitch (Dirty)" (3:29)
 "Life's a Bitch (Instrumental)" (3:29)

B-side
 "Life's a Bitch (Arsenal Radio Mix)" (3:31)
 "Life's a Bitch (Arsenal Dirty Mix)" (3:31)
 "Life's a Bitch (Arsenal Instrumental Mix)" (3:35)

References

1993 songs
1994 singles
Nas songs
Song recordings produced by L.E.S. (record producer)
Songs written by Nas
Jazz rap songs